Fulham Railway Bridge crosses the River Thames in London. It is very close to Putney Bridge, and carries the London Underground District line between Putney Bridge station on the North, and East Putney station on the South. Fulham Railway Bridge can also be crossed on foot, on the downstream (east) side.  

Originally referred to by its design engineers W. H. Thomas and William Jacomb as Putney Railway Bridge it has no official name, but for over a hundred years it has been known colloquially as "The Iron Bridge".

History
It was designed for the London and South Western Railway  by Brunel's former assistant William Jacomb, built by Head Wrightson and opened in 1889.

It was refurbished between 1995 and 1997 for the London Underground by Tilbury Douglas, and it was at that time that a plaque bearing the erroneous title Fulham Railway Bridge was attached to the pillar at the top of the pedestrian stairway on the Putney (Southern) downstream side of the bridge.

See also
 Crossings of the River Thames
 List of lattice girder bridges in the United Kingdom
 List of bridges in London

References

Further reading
 Chris Roberts: Cross River Traffic: A history of London's Bridges, Granta 2006 ,

External links
 

Bridges across the River Thames
Bridges in London
Buildings and structures in the London Borough of Hammersmith and Fulham
Buildings and structures in the London Borough of Wandsworth
Railway bridges in London
Bridges completed in 1889
Transport in the London Borough of Hammersmith and Fulham
Transport in the London Borough of Wandsworth